Khandvi is a village in Jalgaon Jamod tehsil of Buldhana district, Maharashtra.

Location
Situated on the confluence of State highways 194 and 196, it serves as an important juncture connecting the Jalgaon Jamod tehsil of Buldhana district to the Muktainagar tehsil of the adjacent Jalgaon Khandesh district.

Demographics

Employment
The main occupation of the village is agriculture.

Places of Importance
There is a temple of Gajanan Maharaj, created on the land donated by Shree Nitin Dnyandeo Pachpor. It is also birthplace of Mr. Pushkar Pachpor

Notes

Villages in Buldhana district
Maharashtra